Pyradena is a monotypic moth genus of the family Crambidae described by Eugene G. Munroe in 1958. Its only species, Pyradena mirifica, described by Aristide Caradja in 1931, is found in China.

References

Spilomelinae
Taxa named by Eugene G. Munroe
Crambidae genera
Monotypic moth genera